Moritz "Morey" Amsterdam (December 14, 1908 – October 28, 1996) was an American actor, comedian, writer and producer. He played Buddy Sorrell on CBS's The Dick Van Dyke Show from 1961 to 1966.

Early life
Amsterdam was born in Chicago, Illinois, the youngest of the three sons of  Max and Jennie (née Finder) Amsterdam, Jewish immigrants from Austria-Hungary.

He began working in vaudeville in 1922 as the straight man for his older brother's jokes. He was a cellist, a skill he used throughout his career. By 1924, he was working in a speakeasy operated by Al Capone.

After being caught in the middle of a gunfight, Amsterdam moved to California and worked writing jokes. His enormous repertoire, and his ability to come up with a joke on any subject, earned him the nickname The Human Joke Machine. He sometimes performed with a mock machine on his chest, hanging by a strap. He turned a hand crank and paper rolled out; he would then pretend to read the machine's joke, although actually the paper was blank.

Amsterdam's reputation for humor preceded him. Hal Block tells of Amsterdam walking up Sixth Avenue in New York City and meeting an old friend. "Where have you been?" the friend asked. "Sick," Amsterdam replied, "I've been in bed with a cold." His friend looked at him and asked, "What's so funny about that?"

Career

Radio
In the late 1940s, Amsterdam had a program on CBS from 9:30 to 10 p.m. Eastern Time on Tuesdays and a daily program on WMGM in New York City.

Television

Amsterdam had a program on CBS that ended in early 1949.

In 1950, he briefly hosted the comedy-variety show Broadway Open House, TV's first late-night entertainment show, on NBC. One of the pioneering TV creations of NBC president Pat Weaver, it demonstrated the potential for late-night programming and led to the later development of The Tonight Show.

In February 1952, Amsterdam made his dramatic TV debut on an episode of the DuMont Television Network series Not for Publication. Also in 1952, he was host of Breakfast With Music, a 9 a.m. Monday-Friday program on WNBT-TV in New York City.

In 1957, he appeared as "Jack Connors" in the third episode ("The Three Pretenders") of the syndicated television sitcom How to Marry a Millionaire, with Barbara Eden and Merry Anders.

In 1958, he appeared as saloon manager Lucien Bellingham in an episode of the CBS western series Have Gun, Will Travel entitled "The Moor's Revenge". He later guest-starred on the CBS sitcom Pete and Gladys, with Harry Morgan and Cara Williams.

His best-known role was as comedy writer Buddy Sorrell on The Dick Van Dyke Show, a role suggested for him by his friend Rose Marie, who also appeared on the show.

The show's creator, Carl Reiner, based the character on his old friend Mel Brooks, with whom he worked on the writing staff of Your Show of Shows. Like Amsterdam himself, Buddy had a ready quip for any situation, and one of the show's most popular running gags was his insult-laden feud with producer Mel Cooley (Richard Deacon). Buddy was also one of the rare overtly Jewish characters on TV in that era, with one episode revolving around his belated decision to have a Bar Mitzvah. Amsterdam also wrote lyrics for the show's theme song, which were never heard on the air, but have been performed by Dick Van Dyke in concert. Van Dyke sang those lyrics on the October 23, 2010 edition of the NPR show Wait Wait... Don't Tell Me!.

In a 1970 (November) episode of The Partridge Family, titled "Did You Hear the One About Danny Partridge?", Amsterdam played the role of Ziggy Shnurr, a small time joke writer, whom Danny found in the Yellow Pages after deciding that the family music act needed some comedy during song breaks.  The Amsterdam role echoed his Dick Van Dyke character. The episode also guested Hollywood veteran Jackie Coogan.

In 1980 (November) episode of The Littlest Hobo titled "Fast Freddie" The Hobo discovers a con man (Amsterdam) operating in a small town and tries to foil his plans to rob a doddering senior.

Amsterdam was an occasional panelist on Match Game and the short-lived Can You Top This? (which he also executive produced) during the 1970s. He appeared as a small-time criminal in several episodes of the soap opera The Young and the Restless in the 1990s. Amsterdam and Rose Marie later appeared as panelists on The Hollywood Squares and guest-starred together in a February 1996 episode of the NBC sitcom Caroline in the City (his final TV appearance).

Films

In 1958, Amsterdam appeared in the low-budget film Machine-Gun Kelly with Charles Bronson, and he did a notable dramatic turn in the 1960 noir classic Murder, Inc. as Catskill nightclub owner Walter Sage, the first victim (according to the film) of the newly minted Murder, Incorporated.

Amsterdam played Cappy, owner of the local nightclub, in the Beach Party movies of the 1960s, which were produced by American International Pictures, of which he was vice president. He and Rose Marie also co-starred in the 1966 film Don't Worry, We'll Think of a Title, a comedy co-written and co-produced by Amsterdam. The film features Richard Deacon, their co-star on The Dick Van Dyke Show, with cameos by the show's co-producer Danny Thomas and co-star Carl Reiner as well as Steve Allen, Milton Berle, Irene Ryan and Moe Howard of the Three Stooges. His later roles included appearances in The Horse in the Gray Flannel Suit (1968), Won Ton Ton, the Dog Who Saved Hollywood (1976), When Nature Calls (1985) and Side by Side (1988).

Personal life
Amsterdam married actress Mabel Todd in 1933; they divorced in 1945 after twelve years of marriage. He married his second wife Kay Patrick in 1949; they remained married until his death in 1996.

Hanna-Barbera lawsuit
In 1963, Amsterdam filed a $12,000 lawsuit against Hanna-Barbera for breach of contract; he claimed that he had been cast and signed to the role of George Jetson. Although his contract stipulated that he would be paid $500 an episode, with a guarantee of twenty-four episodes (i.e., a full season) of work, he recorded only one episode before being replaced. Several sources claimed the change had occurred as a result of sponsor conflict with Amsterdam's commitment to The Dick Van Dyke Show. The case had been closed by early 1965 and the court had ruled in favor of Hanna-Barbera.

Death
Amsterdam died at Cedars Sinai Hospital in Los Angeles, California, on October 28, 1996, at the age of 87, due to a heart attack.

He was entombed at Forest Lawn - Hollywood Hills Cemetery in Los Angeles.

Filmography

Film

Television

Production credits

Writer
Hollywood Hobbies (1939)
Kid Dynamite (1943) (additional dialogue)
The Ghost and the Guest (1943) (screenplay)
Bowery Champs (1944) (additional dialogue)
The Morey Amsterdam Show (1948–1950) (3 episodes)
Columbia Animal Cavalcade 1: Chimp-Antics (1952) (narrative)
Don't Worry, We'll Think of a Title (1966) (screenplay)

Producer
The Morey Amsterdam Show (1949–1950) (2 episodes)
Don't Worry, We'll Think of a Title (1966)
Black, Kloke & Dagga (1967) (uncredited)
Can You Top This (1970–1971) (46 episodes)

Further reading
 Keep Laughing. Citadel Press, 1959. ASIN B0007E665M
 Morey Amsterdam's Benny Cooker Crock Book for Drinkers. Regnery, 1977.

References

External links

 
 Filmography of Morey Amsterdam at The New York Times
 Catalogue of his shows in the radioGOLDINdex database
 

1908 births
1996 deaths
American male comedians
American radio personalities
American male radio actors
American male television actors
American people of Austrian-Jewish descent
Male actors from Chicago
Musicians from Chicago
Jewish American writers
Jewish American male actors
Jewish American musicians
American cellists
Vaudeville performers
Male actors from New York City
Male actors from Los Angeles
Burials at Forest Lawn Memorial Park (Hollywood Hills)
20th-century American male actors
20th-century American male musicians
Comedians from Los Angeles County
Comedians from New York City
Comedians from Illinois
Jewish American male comedians
20th-century American comedians
20th-century American Jews
20th-century cellists